Star Cineplex is a Bangladeshi movie theater chain. It is owned by Show Motion Limited and the first of its type in Dhaka, Bangladesh.

History
Star Cineplex was founded on 9 October 2004, in Bashundhara City. In 2016, it opened its first theatre in Cox's Bazar. Star Cineplex has six fully digital cinema screens with state-of-the-art 3D Projection Technology, silver screens, Dolby-Digital sound and stadium seating.  With a total capacity of approximately 1600 seats the theater has large lobby with full concession stands serving pop-corns, soft drinks, ice-creams and many other items. In January 2019, they opened their second cineplex in Dhaka at Shimanto Shambhar, a newly built shopping centre beside Shimanto Square. In October 2019, they opened their third cineplex in SKS Tower, Mohakhali DOHS. In August 2021, they opened their 4th cineplex in Mirpur-2 by replacing Sony Cinema. They opened their fifth cineplex in Bangabandhu Military Museum on April, 2022 with state-of-the-art sound system and a capacity of 183 seats. Star Cineplex opened their first branch outside Dhaka, in Chittagong, on 2 December 2022.

Controversy
In August 2022, the authority was accused of not selling ticket of Poran to a senior citizen named Saman Ali Sarkar for wearing lungi at the Sony Square branch of Star Cineplex. When the whole incident went viral on the internet, there was outrage among the people and many went to Star Cineplex wearing lungi to watch films in protest. The authority apologized for the incident in August 4 and Saman was allowed to watch the film with his family that day.

References

Cinema chains in Bangladesh
2004 establishments in Bangladesh
Mass media companies of Bangladesh